Conduct Unbecoming: Lesbians and Gays in the U.S. Military from Vietnam to the Persian Gulf War is a 1993 book by American journalist Randy Shilts, in which the author traces the participation of gay and lesbian personnel from the Revolutionary War to the late 20th century.

The book was well received in a review in the Los Angeles Times which described it as "gripping reading" and "an irrefutable indictment of unconscionable government behavior in a cause that the military seems still unable to explain". The historian Lillian Faderman called the book "famous" in The Gay Revolution: The Story of the Struggle (2015).

See also
 Don't ask, don't tell
 Sexual orientation in the United States military
 Sexual orientation and gender identity in the United States military
 Sexual orientation and gender identity in military service
 Bibliography of works on the United States military and LGBT+ topics

References

1990s LGBT literature
1993 non-fiction books
Books by Randy Shilts
English-language books
Lambda Literary Award-winning works
LGBT literature in the United States
LGBT and military-related mass media
Sexual orientation and the United States military